The 2002 UEFA European Under-21 Championship qualification began in 2000. The final tournament was held in 2002. The 47 national teams were divided into nine groups (one group of four, five groups of 5, and three groups of 6). The records of the nine group runners-up were then compared.  The top seven joined the nine winners in a play-off for the eight finals spots. One of the eight qualifiers was then chosen to host the remaining fixtures.

Qualifying group stage

Draw
The allocation of teams into qualifying groups was based on that of 2002 FIFA World Cup qualification with several changes, reflecting the absence of some nations:
 Groups 3, 4, 5, 8 and 9 featured the same nations
 Group 1 did not include Faroe Islands
 Group 2 did not include Andorra
 Group 6 did not include San Marino
 Group 7 did not include Liechtenstein, but included France (who did not participate in World Cup qualification)

Group 1

 qualify as group winners fail to qualify as one of best runners-up

Group 2

 qualify as group winners qualify as one of best runners-up

Group 3

(*) Match awarded 3-0 to N.Ireland due to Malta fielding an ineligible player. qualify as group winners fail to qualify as one of best runners-up

Group 4

 qualify as group winners qualify as one of best runners-up

Group 5

 qualify as group winners qualify as one of best runners-up

Group 6

 qualify as group winners qualify as one of best runners-up

Group 7

 qualify as group winners qualify as one of best runners-up

Group 8

(*) Match awarded 3-0 to Romania due to Lithuania fielding an ineligible player. qualify as group winners qualify as one of best runners-up

Group 9

 qualify as group winners qualify as one of best runners-upGreece (16pts) Germany (16pts) head-to-head:2-1 in GER, 2-0 in GRE.: Greece better (3-2 on aggregate)

Ranking of second-placed teams
Because groups contained different number or teams (six, five and four), matches against the fifth- and sixth-placed teams in each group are not included in the ranking. As a result, six matches played by each team counted for the purposes of the second-placed table. The top seven advanced to the play-off.

Play-offs

|}

External links 
 Results Archive at UEFA.com
 RSSSF Results Archive at rsssf.com

 
2002 UEFA European Under-21 Championship
Qual
UEFA European Under-21 Championship qualification